Mario Vitti (18 August 1926 – 14 February 2023) was an Italian-Greek researcher of New Greek philology, Honorary Professor of New Greek Philology at the University of Tuscia in Viterbo, Italy.

Vitti died on 14 February 2023, at the age of 96.

References

Literature
 Maria Mondelou: L’insegnamento del greco, la nostra identità più genuina. A colloquio con il professor Vincenzo Rotolo, in: Foroellenico. Pubblicazione bimestrale a cura dell’Ufficio Stampa dell’Ambasciata di Grecia in Italia, Anno X, n° 4, 2008, 21–23,  online (PDF)
  Marinos Pourgouris: Mediterranean Modernisms. The Poetic Metaphysics of Odysseus Elytis (2016)

External links
 Publications by Mario Vitti in the OPAC of the Servizio Bibliotecario Nazionale
 Mario Vitti Bibliography 
 Lecture Announcement Vienna 2006 (with photo)

1926 births
2023 deaths
Academic staff of the University of Geneva
Academic staff of the University of Palermo
Academic staff of the University of Paris
Academic staff of the Aristotle University of Thessaloniki
Academic staff of Tuscia University
Sapienza University of Rome alumni
Hellenists
20th-century Italian translators
21st-century Italian translators
Academics from Istanbul
Writers from Istanbul
Italian philologists
20th-century philologists
21st-century philologists
Constantinopolitan Greeks